Twentyears is a greatest hits album by French electronic music duo Air, released on 10 June 2016 by Airchology and Parlophone. The standard two-CD set contains a 17-track "best-of" disc and a second disc featuring 14 rarities, including two previously unreleased tracks, "Roger Song" and "Adis Abebah". A limited super deluxe edition box set, consisting of three CDs and two vinyl records, was released on 22 July 2016, including a third CD of remixes the duo have created for other artists.

Track listing

Charts

References

2016 greatest hits albums
Air (French band) albums
Albums produced by Nigel Godrich
Parlophone compilation albums